The D.B. Wilson Generating Station is a coal-fired power plant operated by Big Rivers Electric Corporation and located near Centertown, Kentucky.

See also

Coal mining in Kentucky

References

External links
 Official website

Energy infrastructure completed in 1984
Coal-fired power plants in Kentucky
Buildings and structures in Ohio County, Kentucky